Pushmonkey is an American rock band from Austin, Texas, United States. Originally known as Billy Pilgrim, they first changed their name to Mad Hatter and later to just Hatter. The band experienced minor radio success with the song "Handslide" from their self-titled album. They were featured in season 7 of Melrose Place. They appeared on Ozzfest in 1999 in support of the album, as well as Woodstock '99. In 2007, the band won the first FameCast.com Battle of the Bands contest.

Members

Current
Tony Park – lead vocals/trumpet
Darwin Keys – drums/vocal (1994–present)
Will Hoffman – guitar/vocals
Pat Fogarty – bass/vocals
Howie Behrens – guitar/vocals

Former
Rico Ybarra – drums/vocals (formation - 1994)

Discography

Studio albums

EPs/singles/promos

Non-album tracks

Yellow demo ("older than dirt")
"Maize" (Pushmonkey) – 5:01
"Neiderwald" (Pushmonkey) – 3:17

El Bitché sessions
"Chained Man" demo (Pushmonkey) – 3:01
"Sunny Days" demo (Pushmonkey) – 3:30

Other studio tracks
"Falling Out of Place" demo (Pushmonkey) – 3:30
"Lefty" acoustic version (Pushmonkey) – 3:08
"Number One" heavy demo version (Pushmonkey) – 4:33
"Pat's a M.F." (Pushmonkey) – 1:03 (No longer available)
"Sorry" demo (Pushmonkey) – 3:20
"When You Were Mine" (Prince) – 4:54

Live tracks
"Ashtray Red" live at The Steamboat, Austin, Texas (Pushmonkey) – 3:34
"Falling Out of Place" live at The Steamboat, Austin, Texas (Pushmonkey) – 3:29
"Limitless" live at The Steamboat, Austin, Texas, September 2002 (Pushmonkey) – 6:58
"Sorry" live at The Steamboat, Austin, Texas (Pushmonkey) – 3:12

See also
Music of Austin

Rock music groups from Texas
Arista Records artists
Musical groups from Austin, Texas